Ketchum is a town in Craig and Mayes counties, Oklahoma, United States. The population was 442 at the 2010 census, a 27 percent gain from 286 at the 2000 census.

History

Ketchum was named for a prominent member of the Delaware tribe and Methodist minister named James Ketchum who helped found the town in 1899. Ketchum was originally located in northeastern Mayes County, on the bank of the Grand River (Neosho River). It was relocated to southeastern Craig County around 1912 when the Kansas, Oklahoma, and Gulf Railroad (KO&G) was being constructed from southeastern Kansas to Texas. The original townsite sat in an area that was later filled in by the creation of Grand Lake o' the Cherokees.

The economy of Ketchum was based on agriculture until Pensacola Dam was built in 1937-1939, creating Grand Lake. Since then, the local economy has largely been dominated by tourism and other businesses related to the lake.

Construction is currently underway to upgrade the town's airport which was formerly known as the Craig County South Grand Lake Airport. A group of private investors is funding the new airport which includes paving the former grass runway. When the new airport is completed it will be a full service regional airport and will be named the South Grand Lake Regional Airport.

Geography
A portion of the town extends south into Mayes County and borders a small arm of Grand Lake.

Highway 85 leads northeast parallel to Grand Lake,  to Bernice.

Demographics

At the 2000 census, there were 286 people, 120 households and 78 families residing in the town. There were 153 housing units at an average density of 327.8 per square mile (125.7/km2). The racial makeup of the town was 68.88% White, 0.35% African American, 18.53% Native American, 0.35% Pacific Islander, and 11.89% from two or more races.

There were 120 households, of which 36.7% had children under the age of 18 living with them, 45.8% were married couples living together, 16.7% had a female householder with no husband present, and 34.2% were non-families. 30.8% of all households were made up of individuals, and 14.2% had someone living alone who was 65 years of age or older. The average household size was 2.38 and the average family size was 2.97.

Age distribution was 29.4% under the age of 18, 7.3% from 18 to 24, 26.9% from 25 to 44, 23.4% from 45 to 64, and 12.9% who were 65 years of age or older. The median age was 36 years. For every 100 females, there were 86.9 males. For every 100 females age 18 and over, there were 77.2 males.

The median household income was $25,000, and the median family income was $32,500. Males had a median income of $25,313 versus $15,781 for females. The per capita income for the town was $13,534. About 10.8% of families and 12.3% of the population were below the poverty line, including 15.2% of those under the age of eighteen and 22.2% of those 65 or over.

References

External links
 Encyclopedia of Oklahoma History & Culture - Ketchum

Towns in Craig County, Oklahoma
Towns in Oklahoma
Populated places established in 1898